The Karadjordje Cup or (Карађорђев куп) is a football tournament held each year in October with a different Australian city as the host. The Tournament is organized by the local Serbian Australian community. The competing clubs have their roots within the Serbian Community but the players that participate reflect the Multicultural society that is Australia.

The first attempt to organize an annual football tournament that would bring together Serbian clubs from Australia took place in 1973. Then, the Avala football club from Sydney (today Bonnyrigg White Eagles FC) organised a tournament called "Nikola Tesla". Only three clubs participated in the tournament, in addition to Avala, FC Mona Vale White Eagles from Sydney and Canberra White Eagles FC from Canberra reported their participation. This competition did not last long. During the 70s and 80s of the 20th century, there were several attempts to organize a football tournament on an annual basis, but without success. FC Belgrade Adelaide and Dianella White Eagles SC started playing mutual cup matches called "Karadjordjev Cup" in 1984. The first, real tournament, which gathered a large number of Serbian clubs from Australia, was organized by Avala from Sydney. The tournament was held on December 26 and 27, 1987, under the name "All-Serbian Transitional Cup Tournament". The title was won by the host of the FC Avala competition, beating the Westgate Sindjelic team from Melbourne in the finals with 4:3 on penalties, since the regular part of the game ended 1: 1. Since then, every year, a tournament of Serbian clubs called "Karadjordjev Cup" is organized in its current form. The only competition was not held in 2001. Until 1996, the rule was that the winner of the tournament had the honor of organizing the next tournament, but after that the cup was organized by agreement.

The Football Association of Australia made a decision in 1992 that all clubs must remove symbolic national symbols from their names, so some clubs were forced to change their names.

Past tournaments

2006 
In 2006 the tournament was held at the Serbian sports centre in Keysborough, Melbourne, Victoria and was hosted by Noble Park United.

Westgate Sindjelic would meet Springvale White Eagles FC in the final with Westgate winning 4-1 on penalties, after 3–3 at full time.

2007 
The 2007 tournament was hosted by White City Woodville at their home ground, The Frank Mitchell Park.

In total 9 teams competed; 5 being from Melbourne, 2 from Adelaide and 2 from Perth.

The eventual winners were Springvale White Eagles, beating Westgate Sindjelic in the final 3-0 on penalties, after 1–1 at full time.

2013 
In 2013 the tournament was held at Northcote, Victoria and was hosted by Fitzroy City SC.

White City Woodville would meet Westgate Sindjelic in the final with White City Woodville winning 1–0.

2014 
In 2014 the tournament was held at Derrimut, Victoria and was hosted by Westgate Sindjelic.

Springvale White Eagles would meet Westgate Sindjelic in the final with White City Woodville winning 5–2.

2018 
In 2018 the tournament was held for the first time in Willawong, Queensland and was hosted by St. George Willawong.

White City Woodville would meet St George Willawong in the final with White City Woodville winning 1–0.

2019 
In 2019 the tournament was held at the Serbian sports centre in Keysborough, Melbourne, Victoria and was hosted by Noble Park United.

Springvale White Eagles would meet Fitzroy Serbia in the final with Springvale White Eagles winning 4-3 on penalties, after 0–0 at full time.

For the first time, a women's competition was held at the same time with Westgate Sindjelic edging out Noble Park United 4-3 on penalties, after 1–1 at full time.

Past Men's Winners

Past Women Winners

See also

List of Serbian football clubs in Australia

References 

Soccer cup competitions in Australia
Serbian-Australian culture